Naorem Mahesh Singh (born 1 March 1999) is an Indian professional footballer who plays as a winger for Indian Super League club East Bengal.

Club career

Early career
Born in Manipur, Singh began his career in his home state with Birchandra Memorial Sporting Club. He soon joined the youth side of Shillong Lajong, playing for the club in the Shillong Premier League.

Shillong Lajong
Prior to the 2018–19 season, Singh was promoted to the first-team. He made his professional debut for Shillong Lajong on 28 October 2018 against Aizawl. He scored a brace, two goals in the 20th and 51st minutes, as Shillong Lajong won 2–1.

Kerala Blasters

In 2020, it was announced that Naorem had signed for the Indian Super League club Kerala Blasters from Shillong Lajong F.C.

Sudeva FC (loan)
In 2021, Mahesh was loaned to the I league side Sudeva Delhi for a season-long deal for getting enough playing time. He made 14 appearances and scored two goals for the club.

East Bengal (loan)
Mahesh was loaned to Kolkata based club East Bengal in 2021. He made 18 appearances and scored 2 goals for them in the 2021–22 Indian Super League season.

East Bengal
On 4 August 2022, Kerala Blasters announced the transfer of Mahesh to East Bengal for an undisclosed transfer fee. On 18 November 2022, he scored against Odisha at the Salt Lake Stadium in a 2–4 loss for East Bengal. He bragged man of the match against Jamshedpur on 27 November 2022 after becoming the first Indian player to get three assists in a single Indian Super League game. He scored again on 19 February 2023, against the Shield Champions Mumbai City at the Mumbai Football Arena in a 1–0 win for East Bengal.

Career statistics

Club

Honours

 Kerala Blasters ‘B’ 
Kerala Premier League: 2019-20

 Individual 
 Indian Super League Emerging Player of the Month: November 2022

References

1999 births
Living people
People from Manipur
Indian footballers
Shillong Lajong FC players
Association football forwards
Footballers from Manipur
I-League players
I-League 2nd Division players
Indian Super League players
Kerala Blasters FC players
Sudeva Delhi FC players
Kerala Blasters FC Reserves and Academy players